Potassium selenide (K2Se) is an inorganic compound formed from selenium and potassium.

Production 
It can be produced by the reaction of selenium and potassium. If the two are combined in liquid ammonia, the purity is higher.

Crystal structure 
Potassium selenide has a cubic, antifluorite crystal structure.

References 

Potassium compounds
Selenides
Fluorite crystal structure